A subdivision of India refers to an administrative division of an Indian state below the level of a district.

A district may have multiple subdivisions, and each of those subdivisions may contain multiple subdistricts and municipalities ('taluk', 'tehsil', 'community development block', 'mandal', or 'circle' depending on the state).

Administration in a subdivision is carried out by Sub Divisional Magistrate (SDM), an entry level IAS officer or State Civil Service Member. 

In West Bengal, for example, Murshidabad district contains five subdivisions ('mahakumas'). Its (Jangipur subdivision) contains seven community development blocks.

Types of administrative division